Town Ground may refer to:

Cricket grounds
Town Ground, Coalville
Town Ground, Heanor
Town Ground, Kettering
Town Ground, Peterborough
Town Ground, Rushden
Town Ground, Worksop

It is also a former name of the Bass Worthington Ground in Burton-on-Trent.

Football grounds
Town Ground (Nottingham)

Suburbs
Town Ground, Honiara